Esther Oluremi Obasanjo also known as Mama Iyabo is a former Nigerian First Lady. She was previously married to President Olusegun Obasanjo.

Biography
Oluremi Akinlawon was the daughter of a station master and Mrs. Alice Akinlawon (nee Ogunlaja). She met Olusegun Obasanjo in the Owu Baptist Church Choir aged 14 and they courted for 8 years. They married on 22 June 1963 at Camberwell Green Registry, SE London when she was aged 21 without the knowledge of their families. She obtained training in institutional management in London.

She assumed the role of First Lady in February, 1976 following a coup that resulted in the death of Murtala Muhammed. She was not often seen at public engagements like Victoria Gowon because Murtala Muhammed decided that it was inappropriate for the spouses of military leaders to be in the public eye.

Works 
In 2008, Obasanjo published an autobiography titled Bitter-Sweet: My Life with Obasanjo in which chronicled her life experiences with Olusegun Obasanjo portraying him as a violent womaniser.

Her style is described as "elegant in a subtle manner" as she was often dressed in traditional outfits.

References

Living people
First Ladies of Nigeria
People from Abeokuta
1941 births